Landscape with a View of the Sea at Sunset is a pen and ink wash drawing by Flemish painter Joos de Momper. It was painted in 1610, and is currently housed at the British Museum in London. The drawing is valuable in that it is the only drawing signed and dated by de Momper.

The drawing shows a view of the sea with the setting Sun. A gulf with sailing boats and mountains are visible in the distance. The painting is bordered by two wooded flanks. To the right, close to the foreground, there sits a cottage facing a country road.

The painting was acquired by the British Museum in 1824.

References

Further reading
 H.G. Franz, 'Meister der Spätmanieristischen Landschaftmalerei in den Niederlanden', in Jahrbuch des kunsthistorischen Institutes der Universität Graz 3-4 (1968-1969), p.62, fig.90 
 K. Ertz, 'Josse de Momper the Younger', Freren, 1986, pp.94-95, fig.43
 T. Gerszi, 'Joos de Momper als Zeichner: Teil 2', in Jahrbuch der Berliner Museen 35 (1993), p.186.
 Popham (D & F) 1932 / Dutch and Flemish drawings of the XV and XVI centuries

External links
 The drawing at the British Museum
 The drawing at the Web Gallery of Art

17th-century drawings
Prints and drawings in the British Museum
Landscape paintings
Paintings by Joos de Momper
Sun in art